Sir Edward Elgar's Introduction and Allegro for Strings, Op. 47, was composed in 1905 for performance in an all-Elgar concert by the newly formed London Symphony Orchestra. Scored for string quartet and string orchestra, Elgar composed it to show off the players' virtuosity. Though initial critical reception was lukewarm at best, the score soon came to be recognized as a masterpiece. The work, which is roughly twelve to fourteen minutes in length, is like a multi-layered symphonic poem for string orchestra, with several prominent themes.

The work is dedicated to Samuel Sanford, who had been instrumental in having Elgar awarded an honorary doctorate of music at Yale University on 28 June 1905, where the Pomp and Circumstance March No. 1 was played for the first time at such a conferral ceremony.

Structure 

The piece opens with a tutti descending fanfare, which segues into a major-key moderato section, interspersed by an Allegretto e poco stringendo section consisting of two measures in length. Foreshadowing into a slow, lyrical theme played by the solo viola, Elgar cascades between solo voice and orchestra by use of echo. Elgar writes that this theme is a quotation of a song sung by a distant voice that he had heard during a holiday in Wales. An expressive, romantic section leads into a recapitulation of the opening fanfare and Welsh theme, ending the Introduction and transitioning jovially into the Allegro.

The Allegro begins with a theme in G major built around a quarter-eighth-eighth note motif.  21 measures of nonstop sixteenth-notes build from piano to a powerful forte as the piece arrives at a hemiola-infused G major restatement of the Introduction's opening fanfare. Instead of a development section as would be expected in traditional sonata form, a new theme is introduced, a vigorous fugue in which the piece returns to the opening key of G minor. In a letter to his good friend A. J. Jaeger ("Nimrod" of the Enigma Variations), Elgar referred to this section as a "devil of a fugue".  After the fugue concludes, the piece's themes are all recapitulated in G major, initially begun by a unison orchestra before dividing across echo between orchestra and solo quartet. With the Welsh theme repeating a succession of three times before striking a momentous , on which the orchestra is in unison again (see Polyphony), it is this time echoed by the solo quartet, a change from the rest of the piece. The Welsh theme appears in all its splendour in a triumphant coda for the fifth and final time, before ending with a ternary perfect cadence followed by a G major  chord in which the whole orchestra plays pizzicato, except for the double basses, who play with their bows.

Composition style 
Introduction and Allegro was composed in a neo-resurrected form of the Baroque concerto grosso. However, such solos are not confined solely to the solo quartet, but rather are distributed ever so often among the accompanying orchestra, such as at the first transition entering the Allegro. The solo quartet, however, often blend back into the orchestra, but rarely play exactly the same notes as the accompanying orchestra.

Polyphony dictates much of the piece, often with multiple themes or motifs interleaving with one another. Since polyphony is the most complex of all musical textures, it comes as no surprise that Introduction and Allegro is an attempt to show the virtuosity of each musician performing the piece.

Much of the piece focuses on the tremendous virtuoso-technicalities within the violin parts. After all, the piece "fully [reflects] Elgar's first-hand knowledge as a former violinist himself". This however adds complications in the lower-frequency instruments, particularly in the bass part, which can clearly be seen as one of the most challenging of string orchestra repertoire. This, however, could be Elgar reminiscing to the Baroque concerto grosso form, in which the cello and bass parts are sometimes the same.

References

External links 

 Full score of the Introduction and Allegro, posted and hosted in its entirety by Google (score begins on page 12)
Recording by the Gardner Chamber Orchestra from the Isabella Stewart Gardner Museum in MP3 format

Compositions by Edward Elgar
Compositions for string orchestra
1905 compositions
Compositions in G minor
Compositions in G major